Marsden Bay may refer to:
Marsden Bay,  Tyne and Wear, a bay on the coast of north-east England, near Marsden, Tyne and Wear
Marsden Bay, New Zealand, a bay at the entrance to Whangarei Harbour in New Zealand